Helena Alypia (in Greek: Ελένη Αλυπία) was a Byzantine empress consort as the wife of Byzantine Emperor Constantine VIII.

Life
Very little is known about her, as she is only briefly mentioned in the Chronographia of Michael Psellos, followed by the works of John Skylitzes and Zonaras. Psellos writes of her only that:

"Constantine while still a young man, had married a lady called Helena. She was a daughter of the renowned Alypius, then the leading man in the city and member of a noble family held in high repute. This lady, who was not only beautiful but also virtuous, bore him three daughters before she died."

Apart from this reference in Psellos, her father Alypius (Αλυπίος) is otherwise unknown. The marriage probably took place ca. 976, and Helena died at some unknown point, apparently long before her husband became sole emperor in 1025. The historian Gunther G. Wolf theorized that she died ca. 989, possibly during the birth of her third daughter.

Their three daughters were:

 Eudokia (Ευδοκία). Eldest daughter. According to the Chronographia "in childhood she had been attacked by some infectious illness, and her looks had been marred ever since". She later became a nun.
 Zoë Porphyrogenita.
 Theodora.

At the time of their marriage, Constantine VIII was the co-ruler of his older brother Basil II. Basil reigned as senior Byzantine Emperor from 976 to 1025 but never married, which would make Helena the only Augusta during his reign.

Possible descendants
Ronald Wells, a modern genealogist, has suggested that Eudokia did not remain a nun for life. He has theorised an identification of Eudokia with the otherwise unnamed wife of Andronikos Doukas, a Paphlagonian nobleman who may have served as governor of the theme of Moesia. This theory would make Helena a maternal grandmother of Constantine X and Caesar John Doukas.

Wells has further suggested two daughters of the above proposed union. The first suggested daughter is Maria, the wife of Ivan Vladislav. Christian Settipani has however posited a more robustly argued descent of Maria from Boris II of Bulgaria. The second daughter is "Sophia", an alleged wife of Manuel Erotikos Komnenos. Manuel was the father of Isaac I Komnenos and John Komnenos, the latter being the father of Alexios I Komnenos.

The claim, which provides no references or argumentation, apparently serves as a way to trace the ancestry of the Doukas and Komnenos families to the Macedonian dynasty. There is however no proof for any such relationship of Eudokia in primary sources or contemporary sigillography and modern historical and prosopographical authorities remain equally silent on the matter, making the asserted descent appear entirely unlikely.

References

Sources 
 Cheynet, Jean-Claude, Pouvoir et Contestations a Byzance (963-1210), Paris: Publications de la Sorbonne, 1996.
 
 Settipani, Christian, Continuité des élites à Byzance durant les siècles obscurs. Les princes caucasiens et l'Empire du VIe au IXe siècle, Paris: De Boccard, 2006.

External links 
 Book 2 of the Chronographia of Michael Psellos which deals with the period 1025-1028. The text is part of the Internet Medieval Source Book.

10th-century births
Macedonian dynasty
10th-century Byzantine empresses
Year of death unknown